Oxytate subvirens, is a species of spider of the genus Oxytate. It is endemic to Sri Lanka.

References

Endemic fauna of Sri Lanka
subvirens
Spiders of Asia
Spiders described in 1907